Jimena María Francisca Emilia Fernández de la Vega y Lombán ( 1895, Vegadeo - 1984 Santiago de Compostela ) was a Spanish doctor, geneticist, and teacher. On 11 February 2021, she has been named 2021 Scientist of the Year, by the Royal Galician Academy of Sciences.

Life 
Her father, Wenceslao Fernández de la Vega Pasarín, was a doctor and was the first director of the Guitiriz spa, in Lugo. She and her sister, Elisa Fernández de la Vega, studied for a university career and a job. They were admitted to the Faculty of Medicine of the University of Santiago. They graduated together. Elisa, like her sister Jimena, also obtained the Grand Cross of Alfonso XII, due to her excellent university record. She entered the Extraordinary Prize contest, which was won by Jimena. She studied in Italy, Switzerland, Germany, Austria, with professors such as F. Kraus, T. Brugsh, E. Baur, E. Fischer (Berlin), H. Poll (Hamburg), J. Baur (Vienna) and N. Pende (Genoa).

In genetics, she was a student of Nóvoa Santos, Gregorio Marañón and Gustavo Pittaluga. She was a professor in the Chair of General Pathology at the Central University of Madrid.

Works 

 “La herencia fisiopatológica en la especie humana”. 1935
 "Vererbungsfragen der Blutkörperchen" (“Preguntas sobre la herencia de los eritrocitos”). 1934
 Herencia de los caracteres psicológicos. Archivos de Neurobiología. 1933; 13:405-417
 La herencia biológica en el hombre. I. Herencia de los caracteres psicológicos. II. Selección y contraselección. En: Noguera, E. y Huerta, L. (eds). Genética, Eugenesia y Pedagogía Sexual. Libro de las Primeras Jornadas Eugénicas Españolas. Madrid: Morata; 1934, pp. 159–181
 Constitución. En: Nóvoa Santos, R. Manual de Patología General. Santiago, 1934. Tomo primero, pp. 375–404
 Coeficientes de correlación entre algunas medidas del hábitus. Anales de Medicina Interna. 1934; 3:341-349
 Consideraciones sobre las hemodistrofias a propósito de un caso clínico. Anales del servicio de Patología Médica del Hospital General de Madrid, 1928-29: 224-231
 Consideraciones etiológicas y patogénicas sobre un caso de hemofilia. Archivos de Cardiología y Hematología 1929 ( 10) :228-231
 “Experimentos de Genética en Drosophila, efectuados en el Instituto Anatómico de Hamburgo”. Boletín de la RSEHN, 1928
 Sobre los procesos de difusión e intercambio entre la sangre y los tejidos. Método de la fluoriscina. Wiener Klinische Wochenschrift. 1927; 25
 “Drosophila y Mendelismus”. Hamburgo, 1927
 “Estado actual de la Biología y Patología Gemelar en su relación con los problemas hereditarios”. Hamburgo, 1926

References 

1895 births
1984 deaths
Spanish geneticists